Pinalitus is a genus of plant bugs in the family Miridae. There are about 6 described species in Pinalitus.

Species
 Pinalitus approximatus (Stal, 1858)
 Pinalitus cervinus (Herrich-Schaeffer, 1841)
 Pinalitus rostratus Kelton, 1977
 Pinalitus rubricatus (Fallén, 1807)
 Pinalitus rubrotinctus Knight, 1968
 Pinalitus solivagus (Van Duzee, 1921)

References

Further reading

 
 
 

Miridae genera
Mirini